Electraglaia is a genus of moths belonging to the subfamily Tortricinae of the family Tortricidae.

Species
Electraglaia caementosa (Meyrick, 1908)
Electraglaia contracta Wang & Li, 2004
Electraglaia isozona (Meyrick, 1908)
Electraglaia nigrapex Razowski, 2009
Electraglaia robusta Wang & Li, 2004

See also
List of Tortricidae genera

References

  1976: Tortricidae from Nepal 2. Zoologische verhandelingen, Leiden, 144: 1-145.
 ,2005 World Catalogue of Insects 5
 , 2009, Tortricidae from Vietnam in the collection of the Berlin Museum.5. Archipini and Sparganothini (Lepidoptera: Tortricidae), Shilap revista de Lepidopterologia 37 (145): 41-60.

External links
tortricidae.com

Archipini
Tortricidae genera